"Last One Standing for You" is a collaborative song by ARIA Award-winning Australian musicians, The Black Sorrows and Jon Stevens. It was released as the second single from the Sorrows' eighth studio album, Lucky Charm. It peaked at number 46 in Australia.

Track listings
CD single (Columbia 660901 1)
 "Last One Standing for You"
 "Yesterday's Girl" (by the Black Sorrows)

Weekly charts

Credits
 Acoustic guitar – Claude Carranza
 Backing vocals – Kenny Simpson, Ron Grant, Wayne Hernandez
 Bass – Steven Hadley
 Drums – Steve Ferrone
 Electric guitar – Stuart Fraser
 Engineer – Brent Clark, Phil Butson
 Keyboards – Charlie Giordano
 Tiple, mandolin – Kerryn Tolhurst
 Saxophone – Joe Camilleri

References

Mushroom Records singles
The Black Sorrows songs
Jon Stevens songs
Songs written by Joe Camilleri
Song recordings produced by Joe Camilleri
1994 singles
1994 songs